Pavel Ondrašík (born 10 December 1975 in Prague, Czechoslovakia) is a motorcycle speedway who first rode in the UK for the Trelawny Tigers in the Premier League. He stayed with the Tigers until their closure in 2003. He then spent seasons with Newport Wasps and the Exeter Falcons. His season with the Somerset Rebels was cut short in 2006 after he suffered a broken wrist.

Pavel is the son of former Czechoslovak international speedway rider Petr Ondrašík.

References

External links
 (en, cz)

1975 births
Living people
Czech speedway riders
Trelawny Tigers riders
Exeter Falcons riders
Newport Wasps riders
Somerset Rebels riders
Sportspeople from Prague